Velten is a town in the Oberhavel district of Brandenburg, Germany. It is situated 10 km southwest of Oranienburg, and 24 km northwest of Berlin.

History
In 1905 Velten had 38 stove factories that delivered 100,000 tiled stoves to Berlin, making Velten Germany's biggest stove-manufacturer.

Demography

Personality 
 Erna Gersinski (1896-1964), resistance fighter against Nazism, lived in Velten.
 Martin Männel (born 1988), soccer goalkeeper, played between his eighth and fourteenth year at SC Oberhavel Velten.
 Emma Ihrer (1857–1911), trade unionist, lived from 1887 to 1894 in Velten

References

External links
 Official site 

Localities in Oberhavel